The name Josephine has been used for six tropical cyclones in the Atlantic Ocean.
 Hurricane Josephine (1984) - long-lived Category 2 hurricane that threatened the East Coast of the United States.
 Hurricane Josephine (1990) - wandered around Atlantic but never threatened land.
 Tropical Storm Josephine (1996) - formed in the Gulf of Mexico, made landfall in Florida, and moved over the eastern states, causing $130 million in damage.
 Tropical Storm Josephine (2002) - short-lived storm that remained in the open sea.
 Tropical Storm Josephine (2008) - storm that remained in the open sea.
 Tropical Storm Josephine (2020) - earliest tenth named storm on record, dissipated north of the Lesser Antilles without affecting land. 

Atlantic hurricane set index articles